The Protagonists is a 1968 Italian drama film directed by Marcello Fondato. It was listed to compete at the 1968 Cannes Film Festival, but the festival was cancelled due to the events of May 1968 in France.

Cast
 Sylva Koscina as Nancy
 Jean Sorel as Roberto
 Pamela Tiffin as Gabriella
 Lou Castel as Taddeu
 Luigi Pistilli as Tassoni
 Maurizio Bonuglia as Nino
 Giovanni Petrucci as Carlo
 Gabriele Ferzetti as Il Commissario
 Renato Romano
 Massimo Sarchielli
 Claudio Trionfi
 Paola Corinti
 Paolo Luciani

References

External links

1968 films
Italian drama films
1960s Italian-language films
1968 drama films
Films directed by Marcello Fondato
Films scored by Luis Bacalov
1960s Italian films